Frederick James Martone (born November 8, 1943) is an American lawyer who serves as a Senior United States district judge of the United States District Court for the District of Arizona.

Early life and education

Born in Fall River, Massachusetts, Martone received a Bachelor of Science from College of the Holy Cross in 1965 and was in the United States Air Force from 1965 to 1969. He then received a Juris Doctor from the Notre Dame Law School in 1972 and a Master of Laws from Harvard Law School in 1975. He was a law clerk to Edward F. Hennessey of the Supreme Judicial Court of Massachusetts from 1972 to 1973.

Career

Martone was in private practice in Phoenix, Arizona from 1973 to 1985, during which time he was a staff attorney to the Supreme Judicial Court of Massachusetts from 1974 to 1975.

Judicial service

Martone was a judge on the Superior Court of Arizona from 1985 to 1992, and a justice of the Supreme Court of Arizona from 1992 to 2001.

On September 10, 2001, Martone was nominated by President George W. Bush to a seat on the United States District Court for the District of Arizona vacated by Roger Gordon Strand. Martone was confirmed by the United States Senate on December 13, 2001, and received his commission on December 21, 2001. He took senior status on January 30, 2013.

References

Sources

1943 births
Living people
20th-century American judges
20th-century American lawyers
21st-century American judges
Arizona lawyers
Arizona Republicans
Arizona state court judges
College of the Holy Cross alumni
Harvard Law School alumni
Justices of the Arizona Supreme Court
Judges of the United States District Court for the District of Arizona
Notre Dame Law School alumni
People from Fall River, Massachusetts
Superior court judges in the United States
United States Air Force officers
United States district court judges appointed by George W. Bush